Richardos Brousalis (born 1917) was a Greek swimmer. He competed in two events at the 1936 Summer Olympics and the water polo tournament at the 1948 Summer Olympics.

References

External links
 

1917 births
Possibly living people
Greek male swimmers
Greek male water polo players
Olympic swimmers of Greece
Olympic water polo players of Greece
Swimmers at the 1936 Summer Olympics
Water polo players at the 1948 Summer Olympics
Sportspeople from İzmir
Smyrniote Greeks